Sümeg is a district in western part of Veszprém County. Sümeg is also the name of the town where the district seat is found. The district is located in the Central Transdanubia Statistical Region.

Geography 
Sümeg District borders with Celldömölk District (Vas County) and Devecser District to the north and east, Ajka District to the east, Tapolca District and Keszthely District (Zala County) to the south, Zalaszentgrót District (Zala County) and Sárvár District (Vas County) to the west. The number of the inhabited places in Sümeg District is 21.

Municipalities 
The district has 1 town and 20 villages.
(ordered by population, as of 1 January 2013)

The bolded municipality is city.

See also
List of cities and towns in Hungary

References

External links
 Postal codes of the Sümeg District

Districts in Veszprém County